= São Sebastião, Porto Alegre =

Neighborhood in Porto Alegre, Brazil

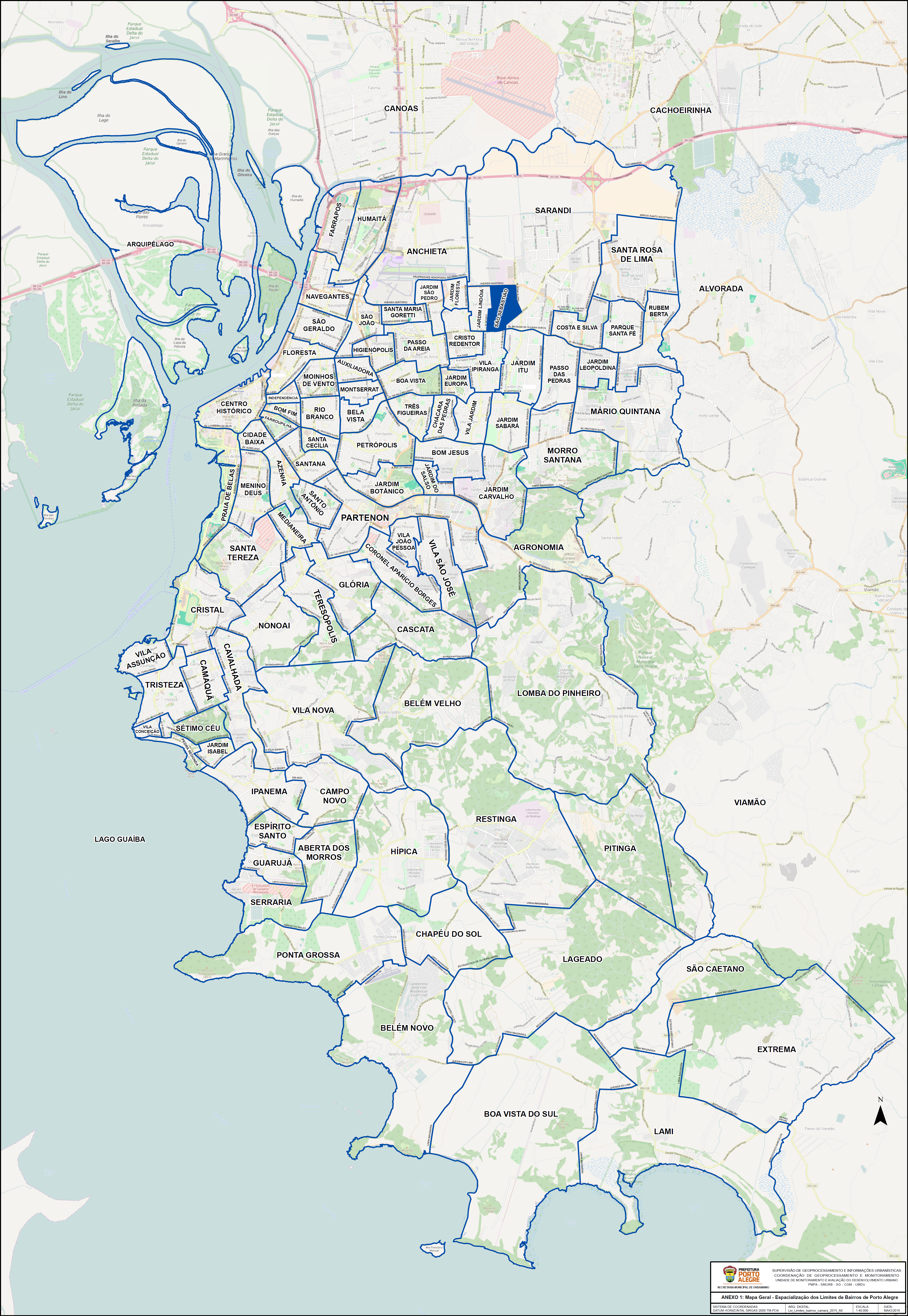

São Sebastião is a neighbourhood (bairro) in the city of Porto Alegre, the state capital of Rio Grande do Sul, in Brazil. It was created by Law 3671 from July 19, 1972.

São Sebastião is a middle class neighbourhood, well-served by shopping malls and supermarkets.
